Alfredo Carricaberry (8 October 1900 – 23 September 1942), nicknamed Vasco, was an Argentine football player. Having spent most of his career at San Lorenzo de Almagro, where he won two titles in 1923 and 1924. Caricaberry also played for the Argentina national team, winning the silver medal at the 1928 Olympic Games and one Copa América in 1927.

Biography
Playing in the right winger position, Caricaberry started his career at the youth divisions of Club Floresta of Buenos Aires, then moving to Estudiantil Porteño of Ramos Mejía where he played at intermediate division. In 1919 he joined San Lorenzo de Almagro, where he spent most of his career playing until 1930 with a total of 297 games and 104 goles. Caricaberry remains nowadays as the 5th. player with more games played ever and the 8th. historic topscorer for the club.

He debuted in Primera División in 1920 against Racing Club, scoring a goal although San Lorenzo lost by 2–1. The first league title with the club came in 1923, being also team's topscorer. The following year San Lorenzo won its second consecutive championship.

Carricaberry debuted in the Argentina national team in November 1922 versus Uruguay in Montevideo. Argentina lost by 2–1 with Carricaberry scoring the only goal for the Argentine side. In 1927 Argentina played two friendly matches against Real Madrid in Buenos Aires. In the second game (won by Argentina 3–2) Carricaberry scored two goals.

San Lorenzo won another league title in 1927, with Caricaberry as team's topscorer again. He remained in the club until 1932 when is transferred to San Lorenzo's arch-rival, Huracán. He played one season there, scoring only one goal. Caricaberry's last club was Argentinos Juniors, where he retired from football in 1937.

Carricaberry's main achievements with the national team were the 1927 South American championship hosted in Peru, with Argentina being champion and he as topscorer. The next year, Argentina won the silver medal at the 1928 Summer Olympics. Argentina played 5 matches, losing the final to Uruguay. Carricaberry was the left winger of the team.

Caricaberry died on 22 February 1942, while descending from a Línea 100 colectivo after suffering a heart attack. He was only 41 years old. It was diagnosed that the cause of death was his addiction to tobacco.

Honours

Club
San Lorenzo
 Primera División (3): 1923, 1924, 1927

National team
Argentina
 Copa América (1): 1927
 1928 Olympic Silver Medal

References

1900 births
1942 deaths
Sportspeople from Entre Ríos Province
Association football wingers
Argentine footballers
San Lorenzo de Almagro footballers
Club Atlético Huracán footballers
Argentinos Juniors footballers
Argentine Primera División players
Argentine people of Basque descent
Footballers at the 1928 Summer Olympics
Olympic footballers of Argentina
Olympic silver medalists for Argentina
Argentina international footballers
Olympic medalists in football
Copa América-winning players
Medalists at the 1928 Summer Olympics